A Capital  (meaning The Capital [City] in English) was a Portuguese afternoon newspaper published in Lisbon, Portugal, between 1968 and 2005.

History and profile
A Capital was first published on 21 February 1968. The paper was established as a result of the editorial conflicts in the daily newspaper Diário Popular.

A Capital had a populist stance. Before the Carnation revolution the paper was owned by different companies, including the Banco Espírito e Comercial de Lisboa, CUF, Tabaqueira and Sorel. The paper was nationalized following the revolution. A Capital was purchased by Prensa Ibérica in 2001.

A Capital ceased publication on 30 July 2005.

References

1968 establishments in Portugal
2005 disestablishments in Portugal
Defunct newspapers published in Portugal
Newspapers published in Lisbon
Portuguese-language newspapers
Publications established in 1968
Publications disestablished in 2005